Mark Raffety (born in Portsmouth, England, UK) is a British Australian actor who played Darcy Tyler in the Australian soap opera Neighbours from 2000 to 2003. He reprised the role for several episodes in 2004 and returned again in 2005.

Biography

Mark has appeared in several films and television series such as The Last Tattoo (1994), Stingers, Hercules: The Legendary Journeys and Xena: Warrior Princess, The Secret Life of Us and Satisfaction.

External links
 
Mark Raffety as Darcy Tyler

Australian male television actors
Male actors from Portsmouth
British emigrants to Australia
Living people
Year of birth missing (living people)